Henry Bigelow may refer to:

Henry Bryant Bigelow (1879–1967), American oceanographer
Henry Forbes Bigelow (1818–1890), American architect
Henry Jacob Bigelow (1867–1907), American surgeon

See also